The 2017–18 Lipscomb Bisons women's basketball team represents Lipscomb University in the 2017–18 NCAA Division I women's basketball season. The Bisons, led by sixth year head coach Greg Brown, play their home games at Allen Arena and were members of the Atlantic Sun Conference. They finished the season 12–19, 7–7 in A-Sun play to finish in fourth place. They advanced to the semifinals of A-Sun Tournament where they lost to Florida Gulf Coast.

Media
All home games and conference road are shown on ESPN3 or A-Sun. TV. Non conference road games are typically available on the opponents website.

Roster

Schedule

|-
!colspan=9 style="background:#; color:white;"| Non-conference regular season

|-
!colspan=9 style="background:#; color:white;"| Atlantic Sun regular season

|-
!colspan=9 style="background:#; color:white;"| Atlantic Sun Women's Tournament

See also
 2017–18 Lipscomb Bisons men's basketball team

References

Lipscomb
Lipscomb Bisons women's basketball seasons